Julie Carol Libarkin is a professor of Earth Sciences and Director of the Geocognition Laboratory at Michigan State University. Her research considers how people understand and make decision about the planet. She is a Fellow of the Geological Society of America. She also researches and addresses inequality in academia, and tracks academic sexual misconduct cases.

Early life and education 
Libarkin studied physics and geology at the College of William & Mary and graduated in 1994. She moved to the University of Arizona for her graduate studies, where she studied palaeomagnetism and cosmogenic isotopes. Upon graduation, Libarkin switched her focus to tectonic and geocognition.

Research and career 
Libarkin was appointed a National Science Foundation Postdoctoral Fellow in the Center for Astrophysics  Harvard & Smithsonian. She was made a Research Associate in 2002. In 2003 Libarkin was appointed Assistant Professor at Ohio University. She moved to Michigan State University in 2006, where she was made  Director of Educational Research in 2011. She was promoted to Professor in 2016, where she Directs the Georecognition Research Laboratory. She investigates how people see and understand the Earth, and how this impacts the decisions they make.

Academic service 
Libarkin is involved with research and mentoring to tackle inequality in academia. She has created a database of reported sexual misconduct cases. As of 2020, the database includes over 1,000 cases – all of which included substantiated reports, institutional findings and legal outcomes. Libarkin has investigated sexual harassment in the physics undergraduate community. She serves on the National Academies of Sciences, Engineering, and Medicine Action Collaborative on Preventing Sexual Harassment in Higher Education. She has called for job applicants to be required to disclose whether they have had formal or informal findings of misconduct against them.

Libarkin has been involved with the transformation of science education, including creating a mechanism to better understand the interactions of science and policy. She serves as a member of the Create for STEM initiative.

Awards and honours 
 2008 Michigan State University Lorena V. Blinn Endowed Teaching Award 
 2014 Michigan State University Global Innovation Fellow
 2015 Elected Fellow of the Geological Society of America
 2017 Geological Society of America Top Geoscience Paper of the Year
 2018 Association of Women Geoscientists Exchange Award
 2019 Commission on the Status of Women Top Paper in the Open Category

Selected publications 
 
 

Libarkin has served as Editor-in-Chief of the Journal of Geoscience Education.

References 

Living people
Year of birth missing (living people)
American geophysicists
Women geophysicists
American earth scientists
American women geologists
Michigan State University faculty
University of Arizona alumni
American women academics
21st-century American women